Armidale is a city in the Northern Tablelands, New South Wales, Australia. Armidale had a population of 24,504 as of June 2018. It is the administrative centre for the Northern Tablelands region. It is approximately halfway between Sydney and Brisbane at the junction of the New England Highway and Waterfall Way.

Geography

Armidale is on the banks of Dumaresq Creek, in the Northern Tablelands in the New England region about midway between Sydney and Brisbane at an altitude (980 m AHD) ranging from 970 metres at the valley's floor to 1,110 metres above sea level at the crests of the hills. A short distance to the east of Armidale are heavily forested steep gorges dropping down to the eastern coastal plain. Large parts of the highlands are covered by Palaeozoic aged metamorphosed sedimentary rocks. Intruding into these meta-sediments are granite plutons which decompose to form sandy soil, slightly deficient in nutrients. There are also basalt flows which are more fertile for the soil substrates. Those areas away from the deep gorge country tend to display gently undulating terrain mainly used for pastures and where granites occur the areas are usually covered in bushland.

The area contains a number of places of outstanding natural beauty and scientific interest as well as several World Heritage national parks including the New England National Park and the Oxley Wild Rivers National Park. To the west is Mount Yarrowyck Nature Reserve. The critically endangered New England Peppermint Grassy Woodland is the main vegetation community in the region.

The coastal plain can be reached directly at Coffs Harbour via Waterfall Way to Dorrigo and Bellingen on the Bellinger River, a two-hour drive.

During winter there is a problem with some  air quality reduction caused by the use of solid fuel domestic wood heaters. A peer-reviewed study carried out by the University of New England in 2007 found winter woodsmoke causes 8.8 additional visits per day to GPs in Armidale for respiratory complaints, i.e., about 750 additional visits per year. Another peer-reviewed study estimated the use of wood heaters in Armidale was responsible for about 11.5 premature deaths per year with estimated annual health cost of $14.95 million – about $4720 per year for every woodheater in the city. A local retired doctor (now Associate Professor at the UNE Medical school) said he is so concerned by the wood smoke situation, he urges people with respiratory problems to leave town.

Climate
Armidale has a subtropical highland climate (Köppen: Cfb). Armidale's elevation gives it a milder climate than most of northern New South Wales, but the summers are still very warm. Winters are long and cool, with many frosty nights. Snowfall is rare, on average only one day in every three years.

In Armidale, the presence of four distinct seasons makes it climatically unlike much of inland Australia; hence, the "New England" moniker and the autumn colours are notable features of the city. Summers are characterised by warm to very warm days followed almost always by cool, sometimes cold, nights. Thunderstorms often produce heavy falls of rain and occasionally hail in the afternoons and early evenings, also bringing a sudden drop in temperature. Unlike nearby coastal areas, Armidale does not usually experience high humidity levels making most of the summer days quite comfortable.
As the leaves turn yellow and fall, day temperatures are mostly still warm, particularly in March and April. Days are sunny, the thunderstorm season is over, and rain becomes more sporadic. Nights become colder, and residents often awake to a thick fog blanketing the Armidale valley, but by 9 am fogs have cleared to be followed by a bright sunny day. The year's first frosts usually occur in April, but they are not severe.

These cold frosty mornings are usually followed by sunny days. These are typical Northern Tablelands winter days with westerly winds, bleak grey clouds, and showers of rain and very occasionally snow. Rainfall during the winter months is not infrequent but is usually light.

In spring temperatures are warmer, although occasional morning frosts still can continue well into October. September is usually a pleasantly mild but windy month, and by late October with increasing heat and humidity the thunderstorm season is starting with increasing rainfalls. The spring months produce the most variable weather of the year. A week of very warm sunny weather can be followed by several milder days with temperatures right back at winter levels before gradually warming up again. This cycle often repeats itself many times until the start of summer.

Weather
Armidale has been prone to severe hailstorms and experienced three such storms over the ten-year period from 1996 to 2006.

The area was declared a disaster zone and State Emergency Service crews were brought in from across the state. Damage was estimated to be in excess of A$200 million.

On 1 January 2000 many homes were damaged by extreme weather conditions which brought large hail stones, strong winds and flash flooding.

On 21 December 2006 hail stones, high winds and flash flooding damaged more than 1,000 homes and destroyed the Armidale Livestock Exhibition Centre which collapsed entirely under the weight of accumulated hail. The city was declared a state of emergency by New South Wales Premier Morris Iemma the following day.

On the night of 14 October 2021 at 10pm, an intense storm produced a tornado causing extensive damage. It tore away roofs and turned vehicles upside down.

Transport

The Armidale railway station is on the Main North railway line and is served by daily passenger trains to and from Sydney. Armidale's airport has five daily scheduled flights to and from Sydney with Qantaslink. Regional airline Fly Corporate operates a scheduled air service with flights to and from Brisbane. Armidale Airport, at 1,084 metres (3,556 ft), is the highest licensed airport in New South Wales.

The city is linked further north by daily coach to Tenterfield provided by NSW TrainLink. Other bus companies such as Greyhound also provide numerous daily services. Local city services are provided on six different routes by Edwards Coaches and Armidale is serviced by 16 taxis.

Although the hills to the north and the south can be a challenge, cycling is an option to get around Armidale. A cycleway exists from the University of New England through the city to the residential areas on the eastern side of city. This cycleway snakes back towards Ben Venue School. The passage through the city provides easy access for cyclists to the shopping centres. Bicycle racks are in strategic locations around the city centre, including at The Armidale Food Emporium, The Armidale Plaza, and Centro Armidale. Places are also provided outside the Armidale Dumeresq War Memorial Library, and at either end of the Mall. A maze of marked cycleways on the shoulder of the roads in the city's southern residential areas allows cyclists to safely ride on the roads. There are also separate cycleways from the Armidale Arboretum along Kellys Plains Road to the south and from the north of the city along Rockvale Road to the Armidale State forest (known as the Pine Forest by locals).

History

Before the British colonial settlement of New South Wales, the indigenous Anaiwan tribe occupied the area that encompasses current day Armidale.

British pastoralists first entered the region in the early 1830s, following the earlier exploration of the area by John Oxley. Oxley recommended the region for grazing, and soon squatters established large leaseholds in the locality. Armidale was initially founded in 1839 by George James MacDonald who was the Commissioner of Crown Lands and head of the local Border Police detachment in the New England district. MacDonald established his barracks on the site and named it after Armadale on the Isle of Skye in Scotland which was the ancestral home of the MacDonald clan.

The James Barnet-designed heritage-listed Armidale Post Office opened on 1 April 1843. The town, which was surveyed in 1848 and gazetted in 1849, was established to provide a market and administration for the farms, but soon after gold was discovered at nearby Rocky River and Gara Gorges, and a gold rush ensued, enlarging the town rapidly in the 1850s. The gold mining settlement of Hillgrove about 40 km east of Armidale was supplied by electricity from Australia's first hydro-electric scheme, the Gara River Hydro-Electric Scheme, remains of which are still visible on the Gara River below the Blue Hole at Castle Doyle. The nearby town of Uralla holds the grave of the famous Captain Thunderbolt – outlaw Fred Ward – who caused trouble in the area in the 1860s. As with Ned Kelly, the locals have adopted him as a larrikin hero and make the most of him as a tourist attraction.

Armidale became a municipality in 1863 and was proclaimed a city in 1885.

Although it does not lie between the two major cities of Sydney and Melbourne, a site just to the south of Armidale was, in the early 1900s, considered as a potential site for Australia's federal capital. Some saw its northerly location as better suited to all three eastern mainland states, including Queensland. Later, particularly in the 1920s and 1930s, Armidale was one of the centres of separatist agitation by the New England New State Movement.  Local politician, David Drummond, a strong supporter of the movement, successfully lobbied for Armidale to have the second teachers' college in New South Wales, and later a university, positioning the town as a potential state capital.

Demographics 

According to the 2021 census, there were 23,967 people in the Armidale significant urban area.
 Aboriginal and Torres Strait Islander people made up 7.9% of the population. 
 74.0% of people were born in Australia. The next most common countries of birth were Iraq 2.4%, England 2.0%, India 1.1%, Nepal 1.1%, and New Zealand 1.0%.
 78.6% of people only spoke English at home. Other languages spoken at home included Kurdish 1.1%, Nepali 1.1% and Mandarin 0.7%. 
 The most common responses for religion were No Religion 36.1%, Catholic 16.7% and Anglican 16.1%.

Armidale is home to a Êzidî community of approximately 600.

City of Armidale

Armidale is a cathedral city, being the seat of the Anglican and Roman Catholic bishops of Armidale. St Peter's Anglican Cathedral, which replaced the original St Peter's Church, was designed by the Canadian architect John Horbury Hunt, who also designed Booloominbah at the University of New England. St Peter's Cathedral opened for worship in 1875 and the tower was added in 1938. The Catholic Cathedral of St Mary and St Joseph was dedicated on 12 December 1919.

The city centre is laid out in a grid of streets. The main street is called Beardy Street, named for two of the founding settlers who had beards. The court house was built in the 1850s and is still a prominent feature of the central district. Much of the rest of the city is residential.

The Australian Wool Fashion Awards, which showcases the use of Merino wool by fashion designers, are hosted by Armidale in March each year. The Autumn Festival is a popular annual event of April in Armidale. The festival features a street parade, stalls and celebrations throughout the city. It is a regular part of the city's attractions, often promoting Armidale's diverse culture (for instance, posters set up by council attempt to attract tourists with the motto "Foodies Thrive in Armidale") and autumn colours. During May the annual New England Wool Expo is staged to display wool fashions, handicrafts, demonstrations, shearing competitions, yard dog trials and demonstrations, a wool bale rolling competition and other activities.

Suburbs

 Acacia Park
 East Armidale
 West Armidale
 Ben Venue
 Bona Vista
 Commissioners Waters
 Dumaresq
 Duval
 Madgwick
 North Hill
 Newling
 Soudan Heights
 South Hill
 St. Patrick's
 The Mission

Education

The city is home to a large number of education facilities, including the Armidale School (1894), New England Girls' School (1895), Presbyterian Ladies' College (PLC Armidale) (1887), and the Armidale Waldorf School (1985), schools of the Australian independent education sector. O'Connor Catholic College (1975) and St Mary's Primary School are systemic Catholic schools. Armidale High School (1911) and Duval High School (1972) were government-funded secondary schools until their closing at the end of 2018. In 2019, the two schools were combined into one in the form of Armidale Secondary College, which is located on what was the Armidale High School campus. It was previously located on the Duval High School campus as a placeholder while the Armidale High campus was partially demolished. Approximately 27% of Armidale's total population is in the 10–24-year age group, compared with an equivalent NSW figure of 18%.

University of New England
The university was founded in 1938, at first as a college of the University of Sydney, but then in its own right in 1954. The UNE contributes to Armidale's position as a city of culture and diversity, with a vibrant artistic and cultural element. The university has strong links to the rural community, and undertakes a lot of agricultural research. There is also a high-technology presence, as well as notable humanities teaching. UNE hosts a wide range of courses, and introduced a number of new courses in 2008, including a five-year Bachelor of Medical Science and Doctor of Medicine program as part of a joint medical program with the University of Newcastle. The university is built around the historic mansion Booloominbah, which is now used for administration and houses a restaurant. UNE is one of the city's main employers.

Retail

Armidale is a major regional retail centre, housing three shopping malls:

 Central Armidale. A A$49 million development anchored by a Woolworths and 32 speciality stores. It began trading under the name 'Centro' in late November 2007, and was rebranded 'Central' in 2014.
 Armidale Plaza, a A$70 million venture, officially opened an extension, refurbishment and rebranding (formerly Kmart Plaza) in August 2007. Armidale Plaza is anchored by Kmart, IGA and 50 specialty stores. Bi-Lo was one of the anchor stores until it closed on 28 February 2010. IGA became an anchor store where it opened there on 8 November 2011. Target Country closed its store in the centre in March 2021.
 The East Mall was constructed in 2002 and houses Coles Supermarket and 15 speciality stores.

Mall
Armidale has a pedestrian mall which stretches over three blocks of Beardy Street in the centre of city. It features many shops and cafés with outdoor eating areas along with some notable architecture, including Tattersalls Hotel, built in the Art Deco style during the 1930s; Armidale Courthouse; the city's main post office; the former Commonwealth Bank and the New England Hotel. The mall was opened in 1973 and was the first of its kind in regional Australia.
Armidale Dumaresq Council has been undertaking major upgrades to the mall since 2003 as part of the Armidale CBD Streetscape Design Project which aims at easing traffic in the city centre by creating an emphasis on the "ring road" around the CBD with the assistance of signage, elevation of roads using paving and the creation of one-way streets.

Sports
The most popular sport in Armidale is rugby union. The city has four teams in the New England Rugby Union: Armidale Blues, Barbarians, Robb College, St. Albert's College, the latter two of which are made up of primarily university students staying on residence at the respective colleges.

A close second in popularity in the city is rugby league. Armidale has two teams competing in Group 19, the Armidale Rams RLFC, and the Narwan Eels, a club with a distinct Indigenous influence. The Rams are based at Rugby League Park on Dumaresq St in Central Armidale, whilst the Eels are based at Newling Oval on the southern outskirts of the city.

Other sports teams include the UNE New England Nomads (University AFL team) and various soccer teams in the local SportUNE League.

Media
The city is serviced by one local newspaper, many radio stations including four local outlets, and all major television stations.

Local press
 Armidale Express
 Armidale Express Extra
 Armidale Independent, closed November 2014

Local radio
 TUNE! FM, one of Australia's oldest community radio stations aimed at a youth audience.
 2AD/FM100.3, a commercial broadcaster owned by the SuperNetwork.
 2ARM 92.1 FM, a community radio station staffed by volunteers and operating from premises in Kentucky Street with a Permanent Community Broadcasting Licence. See program guide at http://2arm.net.au 
 88.0 is a narrowcast tourist radio station.
87.6 Raw FM Australia (Dance Floor Radio Network)

National radio
 Triple J.
 ABC Radio National.
 ABC Classic FM.
 2KY National Racing Service.
 ABC Local Radio.

Television stations

 Prime7, 7Two, 7mate, 7flix – Seven Network affiliated channels.
 Nine (NBN Television), 9Go!, 9Gem, 9Life – Nine Network owned channels..
 WIN Television, 10 Bold, 10 Peach – Network Ten affiliated channels.
 ABC, ABC TV Plus, ABC Me and ABC News, part of the Australian Broadcasting Corporation.
 Special Broadcasting Service, SBS, SBS Viceland, SBS Food and NITV.

Subscription Television services are provided by Foxtel.

Attractions
 Armidale and Region Aboriginal Cultural Centre and Keeping Place
 Oxley Wild Rivers National Park, which includes Dangar Falls and Gorge and Gara Gorge
 Saumarez Homestead
 New England Regional Art Museum
 Cathedral Rock National Park
 Waterfall Way and Wollomombi Falls
 Mount Yarrowyck Aboriginal Rock Art site
 Gemstone fossicking

Heritage listings 

Armidale has a number of heritage-listed sites, including:
 158 Beardy Street: Armidale Post Office
 164 Beardy Street: Commercial Bank of Australia Building
 216 Brown Street: Armidale railway station turntable
 234 Brown Street: Armidale railway station
 125 Dangar Street: Central Park, Armidale
 132 Dangar Street: Saints Mary and Joseph Catholic Cathedral
 108 Faulkner Street: Lands Board Office
 60 Madgwick Drive: Booloominbah
 122-132 Mossman Street: Old Teachers' College
 36 Roseneath Lane: Roseneath
 122 Rusden Street: St Peter's Cathedral
 230 Saumarez Road: Saumarez Homestead
 Allingham Street: Hunter River Lancers Training Depot

Notable people
The following notable people were either born in, currently live in or previously resided in Armidale

 Peter Allen, singer and stage performer
 Charles Badham (1884–1943) medical practitioner and public health officer
 Archie Barwick, farmer and WWI sergeant
 Jack Bedson, children's author and poet
 Kate Bell, actress
 Anya Beyersdorf, actress
 Leigh Blackmore, writer and editor
 Florence Turner Blake (1873–1959) artist and benefactor
 Zihni Buzo, engineer
 Alex Buzo, playwright
 Gilbert Ernest Cory (1906–1977) solicitor and army officer
 Zelman Cowen, 19th Governor General of Australia, in office from 1977 to 1982, vice-chancellor of the University of New England (1966–1970)
 Bruce Devlin, professional golfer, sportscaster and golf course designer
 Edward Doody, Catholic bishop
 Cadel Evans, professional cyclist
 Hugh Gordon, veterinary parasitologist
 Bill Hirschberg (1881–1963), rugby union player
 Anthony Kelly, martial artist
 Sir Frank Kitto, former High Court Judge, former Chancellor of the University of New England
 John McIntosh – Australian politician, member of the New South Wales Legislative Council
 John Monckton (1938–2017) Olympic backstroke silver medallist
 Anne Plunkett, Australian Ambassador to Ireland; Portugal
 Gayla Reid, writer
 Nich Richardson, television presenter and producer
 Frank Roberts, boxer
 Joe Roff, rugby union player
 Caroline Ann Rowland (in religion Mother Mary Cadula), founder of St Ursula's College, Armidale
 Sir Mark Sheldon (1871–1956) Businessman
 Angelina Sondaq, Miss Indonesia 2001 and politician, was born and educated in Armidale.
 Elzear Torreggiani, Catholic bishop
 Peter Turnbull, WW2 fighter ace
 Margaret Vyner, model and actress
 Don Walker, keyboardist for Cold Chisel
 George Warnecke (1894–1981), journalist, publisher, and founding editor of The Australian Women's Weekly
 Dean Widders, rugby league player
 Sir Thomas George Wilson (1876–1958) obstetrician and gynaecologist
 Judith Wright, poet

Sister cities 
  Masterton, New Zealand

References

External links

 Armidale.info
 Photographs of Armidale in 1994, National Library of Australia
 Armidale Regional Council
 VisitNSW.com – Armidale

 
Towns in New England (New South Wales)
Armidale Regional Council
Populated places established in the 1830s
Proposed sites for national capital of Australia